Goddard High School may refer to:
Goddard High School (Kansas) in Goddard, Kansas
Goddard High School (New Mexico) in Roswell, New Mexico